Kaajal is a 1965 Bollywood film produced by Pannalal Maheshwari and directed by Ram Maheshwari. The film stars Meena Kumari, Raaj Kumar, Dharmendra, Padmini, Mumtaz, Mehmood, Durga Khote, Helen. The film's music is by Ravi.

The film is adapted from Gulshan Nanda's novel "Maadhavi" by Phani Majumdar with Kidar Sharma writing the dialogues. The film was declared as a "Hit" at Box office India and was the tenth-highest-grossing film and was listed amongst the Top 20 films of 1965. The film was remade in Telugu as Maa Inti Devatha.

Plot
The clerk in Ranimaa (Durga Khote)'s family lives with his son, Kaushal and daughter, Madhavi (Meena Kumari). After he dies, Ranimaa brings up both children as her own, along with her only son, Rajesh (Dharmendra). Years later, Rajesh has grown up and is of marriageable age. He meets with beautiful Bhanu Saxena (Padmini) and both fall in love with each other. Kaushal dies in a boating accident shortly after this, leaving behind a devastated Madhavi. Rajesh blames himself and Ranimaa for his death. A few months later, Rajesh marries Bhanu and she moves in with them. Bhanu dislikes Madhavi and would like her out of the way, she goes to the extent of accusing her of having an affair with her husband. Under pressure, Madhavi goes to kill herself, and is rescued by a young man named Moti (Raaj Kumar). Rajesh likes Moti and would like him to marry Madhavi, to which he agrees. After the marriage, Madhavi bids adieu to Ranimaa, and Rajesh, and moves in with Moti. What Madhavi does not know that Moti had an agenda and an ulterior motive for marrying her, and it seems she has been dumped from the frying pan into the fire.

Cast
 Meena Kumari as Madhavi 
 Raaj Kumar as Moti 
 Dharmendra as Rajesh
 Padmini as Bhanu 
 Mehmood as Bhola
 Mumtaz as Jharna
 Durga Khote as Ranimaa 
 Gajanan Jagirdar as Mr. Saxena 
 Helen as Courtesan
 Ramayan Tiwari as Kalu Mali / Kalicharan   
 Tun Tun as Amba 
 Gopal Sehgal as Amba's Mama
 Sailesh Kumar as Kaushal

Music
The songs of the film are penned by Sahir Ludhianvi and are composed by Ravi. Playback singers are Mohammed Rafi, Asha Bhosle and Mahendra Kapoor.

Awards

 13th Filmfare Awards:

Won

 Best Actress – Meena Kumari
 Best Supporting Actress – Padmini

Nominated

 Best Actor – Raaj Kumar
 Best Supporting Actor – Raaj Kumar
 Best Male Playback Singer – Mohammad Rafi for "Choo Lene Do"
 Best Story – Gulshan Nanda

References

External links
 
  Kaajal on YouTube

1965 films
Films scored by Ravi
1960s Hindi-language films
Films based on Indian novels
Films with screenplays by Phani Majumdar
Hindi films remade in other languages